Susanne Menden-Deuer is an oceanographer and marine scientist known for her work on marine food webs, including their structure and function. As of 2022 she is president-elect of the Association for the Sciences of Limnology and Oceanography.

Education and career 
Menden-Deuer received her Diplom in 1996 from the University of Bonn. She went on to receive an M.Sc. (1998) and a Ph.D. (2004) from the University of Washington. Following her Ph.D. Menden-Deuer worked at Princeton University and Western Washington University. She moved to the University of Rhode Island in 2008, and was promoted to professor i 2017.

In 2022, the Association for the Sciences of Limnology and Oceanography announced Menden-Deuer as president-elect for the society.

Research 

Menden-Deuer is known for her work on the motility of plankton and their production. Her early work presented carbon-to-volume relationships for small marine organisms, a paper with Evelyn Lessard that was recognized in 2016 as one of the most highly cited papers in the journal Limnology and Oceanography. Subsequent work looked at foraging behavior by plankton organisms, and expanding methods used to quantify grazing activity in marine systems. Menden-Deuer and her student Elizabeth Harvey, determined that the phytoplankton Heterosigma akashiwo moves away from predators, a behavior not previously observed in phytoplankton.

As part of her work in the classroom, Menden-Deuer works with her students to edit Wikipedia.

Selected publications

Awards and honors 
In 2015 Menden-Deuer was named a fellow of the Association for the Sciences of Limnology and Oceanography, and in 2020 was named a sustaining fellow. She received the Hutner Award, named after Seymour Hutner, from the International Society of Protistologists in 2015.

References

External links

Further reading 

 

Living people
University of Bonn alumni
University of Washington alumni
University of Rhode Island faculty
Women ecologists
Women oceanographers
Women marine biologists
Year of birth missing (living people)